Frederick David Sassoon (1 May 1853 – 4 May 1917) was an India-born Anglo-Jewish merchant and banker in Hong Kong and China.

Early life 
Sassoon was born in Bombay, British India on 1 May 1853, Frederick David Sassoon was the eighth son of David Sassoon, founder of the famous firm of merchant and bankers in the East, David Sassoon & Co.

Career 
Sassoon spent most of his working life in Hong Kong and was unofficial member of the Legislative Council of Hong Kong as the representative of the Justices of the Peace from 1884 to 1887. He became Chairman of David Sassoon & Co. in London and also Director of the Imperial Bank of Persia.

Personal 
He married Jeanette (Jenny) Raphael (1859–?), daughter of Edward L. Raphael from another great merchant banking dynasty. They had a son named Ronald Edward David Sassoon (1895–1924), who died of a heart attack while visiting the Bagdad office of David Sassoon & Co.

Frederick David Sassoon left £696,400 when he died on 14 May 1917 at 17 Knightsbridge, London.

See also
 Sassoon family

References

1853 births
1917 deaths
British expatriates in Hong Kong
British people in colonial India
British people of Indian descent
English Jews
English people of Indian-Jewish descent
English people of Iraqi-Jewish descent
Hong Kong Jews
Hong Kong businesspeople
Chairmen of HSBC
Indian people of Iraqi-Jewish descent
Members of the Legislative Council of Hong Kong
Businesspeople from Mumbai
Frederick David
19th-century English businesspeople